JANOG is the Internet network operators' group for the Japanese Internet service provider (ISP) community. JANOG was originally established in 1997.

JANOG holds regular meetings for the ISP community, with hundreds of attendees. Although JANOG has no formal budget of its own, it draws on the resources of its member companies to do so.

References

External links 
 JANOG English-language home page
 Main Japanese-language JANOG home page

Internet Network Operators' Groups
Computer networking
Organizations established in 1997
Internet in Japan
Trade associations based in Japan